Amir Mangal (born 1 January 1989) is a German cricketer who plays for the national team. In May 2019, he was named in Germany's Twenty20 International (T20I) squad for their three-match series against Belgium. The matches were the first T20Is to be played by the German cricket team. He made his T20I debut for Germany against Belgium on 11 May 2019. Later the same month, he was named in Germany's squad for the Regional Finals of the 2018–19 ICC T20 World Cup Europe Qualifier tournament in Guernsey. He played in Germany's opening match of the Regional Finals, against Guernsey, on 15 June 2019.

References

External links
 

1989 births
Living people
German cricketers
Germany Twenty20 International cricketers
Afghan emigrants to Germany
People from Paktia Province